The Rosario de Perijá Municipality is located in Zulia, Venezuela. It was founded in 1989. The municipality has a total surface of 3543 km² and it has some 67 712 inhabitant (2001 census). Its capital is Villa del Rosario. The municipality is made of three civil parishes: Donaldo García (7.489 inhabitants), El Rosario (53.953 inhabitants) and Sixto Zambrano (6.270 inhabitants).

The local economy is based primarily on cattle raising. There is also an important exploitation of limestone for the cement industry.

Population 

The majority of the population is made up of average mixed-race Venezuelans, but there are Native American communities in the Western and Northern parts: Yukpa and Wayuu Indians. There is also a small community of Japrería Indians.

There has been a serious conflict for several decades between the Native American population and the cattle ranchers for the use of the lands.

Climate 
Minimum monthly temperature varies with elevation between 6.9 and 23.4 °C while maximum temperatures are between 17.9 and 33.4 °C. Annual precipitation is between 1228 and 2151 mm, with most rainfall between September and November, and the driest quarter between January and March.

Fauna, flora and vegetation 

The municipality of Rosario de Perijá lies in the Cordillera Oriental Montane Forests ecoregion, and the major natural habitat type is tropical and subtropical moist broadleaf forests.

Common birds include Great Egret (Ardea alba), Mealy Parrot (Amazona farinosa), Bicolored Wren (Campylorhynchus griseus), Brown-throated Parakeet (Aratinga pertinax), Tropical Kingbird (Tyrannus melancholicus), Carib Grackle (Quiscalus lugubris). At least 28 species of dung beetles have been reported in systematic surveys, including Canthon.mutabilis, Canthidium.lebasi, Onthophagus.marginicollis, Dichotomius.agenor, Coprophanaeus.gamezi, Canthon.lituratus.

Politics 

Colombian media announced on 17 July 2010 that FARC had a camp in this area. The Venezuelan government denied it.

References 

Municipalities of Zulia
1989 establishments in Venezuela